The Spinoza Prize is an annual award of 2.5 million euro prize money, to be spent on new research given by the Dutch Research Council (NWO). The award is the highest scientific award in the Netherlands. It is named after the philosopher Baruch de Spinoza.

The prize is awarded to researchers in the Netherlands who belong to the best in their field. Academics can nominate each other and an international commission evaluates the submissions. It is sometimes referred to as the Dutch Nobel Prize.

List of winners
The following persons have received the Spinoza Prize:

References

External links 
 

Awards established in 1995
Dutch science and technology awards
1995 establishments in the Netherlands
Baruch Spinoza